Rojek is a Canadian documentary film, directed by Zaynê Akyol and released in 2022.

Content
Documenting the recovery of Kurdistan from the Rojava–Islamist conflict, the film centres in part on interviews with imprisoned former members of the Islamic State about their motivations.

Release

The film premiered on April 13, 2022 at the Visions du Réel film festival in Switzerland. It had its Canadian premiere at the 2022 Hot Docs Canadian International Documentary Festival, where it won a Special Jury Prize from the Best Canadian Feature Documentary jury.

References

External links
 

2022 films
2022 documentary films
Canadian documentary films
2020s Canadian films
Films set in Kurdistan